Richard Boyle was an American football player and coach. He served as the head football coach (1939–1941, 1946–1949) and head baseball coach (1950–1958) at San Francisco State University.

Boyle played college football at Saint Mary's College of California, where he was instrumental in the 1930 Saint Mary's Gaels football team's upset of Eastern powerhouse Fordham.

Head coaching record

Football

References

Year of birth missing
Year of death missing
American football halfbacks
Saint Mary's Gaels football players
San Francisco State Gators football coaches
San Francisco State Gators baseball coaches